Mervyn Frederick "Merv" McIntosh (25 November 1922 – 3 May 2010) was an Australian rules footballer in the (then) West Australian National Football League (WANFL).  A brilliant ruckman, he was awarded the Sandover Medal as the fairest and best player in the league three times while playing with the Perth Football Club.

Playing career
Merv McIntosh played 217 games for Perth (severely curtailed by the World War II years), plus 20 state games for Western Australia in the period 1939 to 1955. In a richly rewarded career he won three Sandover Medals, three Simpson Medals and a Tassie Medal (as the best player at the 1953 Adelaide National Football Carnival). He was named in the 1953 All-Australian Team.

His Simpson Medal winning performance in his last game, propelling Perth to a two-point victory in the 1955 WANFL Grand Final (Perth's first for 48 years), is legendary. At half-time, East Fremantle had a 34-point lead, but in the third quarter McIntosh led his side to get within two points at the last change. In the final quarter, kicking into the wind, Perth got in front and hold East Fremantle at bay to win 11.11 (77) to 11.9 (75). McIntosh's strategy was to stay in the dead pocket and repeatedly knock the ball out-of-bounds.

He won seven best and fairest awards for his club. He is depicted in a Western Australian state guernsey in Jamie Cooper's painting The Game That Made Australia, commissioned by the AFL in 2008 to celebrate the 150th anniversary of the sport.

Honours
In 1996, Merv McIntosh was an inaugural inductee in the Australian Football Hall of Fame. In 2021, he was elevated to Legend status, becoming the first player who played his entire career in the WANFL/WAFL to receive the honour.

In 2004, he was inducted into Legend Status in the West Australian Football Hall of Fame.

The Merv McIntosh Entrance to the Subiaco Oval was named in his honour.

War service
McIntosh enlisted with the Australian Army in 1941 and was discharged in 1946.

Family
McIntosh was married to Betty. Together they had six children. Their daughter, Jill McIntosh, is a former Australia netball international and national team head coach.

References 
 
 AFL Hall of Fame

Footnotes

1922 births
2010 deaths
Perth Football Club players
Australian Football Hall of Fame inductees
Sandover Medal winners
All-Australians (1953–1988)
Australian rules footballers from Perth, Western Australia
West Australian Football Hall of Fame inductees
Australian Army personnel of World War II
Military personnel from Western Australia